Eulithidium substriatum is a species of small sea snail with calcareous opercula, a marine gastropod mollusk in the family Phasianellidae, the pheasant snails.

Description
(Description as Tricolia substriata) The form of the shell is as in Phasianella variegata Lamarck, 1822 but the whorls, except the nuclear whorl, are very
delicately striate, the body whorl with about ten striae.

Distribution
This species occurs in the Pacific Ocean from Lower California to Panama.

References

 Turgeon, D., Quinn, J. F., Bogan, A. E., Coan, E. V., Hochberg, F. G., Lyons, W. G., Mikkelsen, P. M., Neves, R. J., Roper, C. F. E., Rosenberg, G., Roth, B., Scheltema, A., Thompson, F. G., Vecchione, M., Williams, J. D. (1998). Common and scientific names of aquatic invertebrates from the United States and Canada: mollusks. 2nd ed. American Fisheries Society Special Publication, 26. American Fisheries Society: Bethesda, MD (USA). ISBN 1-888569-01-8. IX, 526 + cd-rom pp

External links
 Carpenter, P. P. (1864). Diagnoses of new forms of Mollusca collected at Cape St. Lucas, Lower California, by Mr. Xantus. Annals and Magazine of Natural History. ser. 3, 13: 311-315; 474-479
 To Biodiversity Heritage Library (5 publications)
 To Encyclopedia of Life
 To ITIS
 To World Register of Marine Species

}

Phasianellidae
Gastropods described in 1864